The Western Baths Club is a Victorian era private swimming and leisure club founded in 1876.  The club remains at its original site at 12 Cranworth Street, Hillhead, Glasgow. The 19th-century baths, designed by Glasgow architects Clarke & Bell, are protected as a category A listed building. Along with the Arlington Baths it is one of two clubs of its kind left in Glasgow.

In recent years the club acquired adjacent ground and erected a new building to house a modern sports hall and gym thereby further enhancing the Club's facilities.  It is also a founding member of the Historic Pools of Britain.

The Baths are distinctive for their period trapeze and exercise rings over the swimming pool.

The 'Baths' as they are more commonly known have survived through mix fortunes over their many years of existence.  Having at one point closed and lay almost derelict but were reopened, a similar fate nearly closed the Baths in the 1970s known as "the day the roof fell in".  The huge Victorian roof collapsed at the shallow end of the pool and with the Cochrane oil-fired boiler rarely working, the whole place was trading at a loss and the membership rapidly dwindling. The Secretary William M Mann CBE, secured advance funding.

The position of Bathsmaster was simply manager but the title referred to those of Victorian swimming pools/clubs. In its long life there were only been five postholders; Campbell, Jamieson, Wilson and Anderson. 

The Baths will continue to have a manager, but the term has changed to general manager (a title previously held by Mr Campbell, who was promoted to general manager, and for a brief period in the 1980s Mr McKellar) who had  overall control of all aspects of the club.  The new position of general manager was awarded to Fraser Makeham, who spent just short of 12 years with the 'Baths' until his resignation; he was succeeded by Mr Lee Ross, who was the deputy general manager; however, Mr Ross has now accepted the post of facilities manager, with Graham Butler McIntosh taking up the post as general manager.

W M Mann died in December 2019.

Changed days since Alison F Blood with her book Kelvinside Days, she wrote, "there were of course other baths in Glasgow, but the Western Baths were simply known as the 'Baths' and no one would have thought otherwise..."

References

External links 
Western Baths Club home page

Sports venues in Glasgow
Swimming venues in Scotland
Category B listed buildings in Glasgow
1876 establishments in Scotland
Hillhead